Boophis rappiodes is a species of frog in the family Mantellidae. It is endemic to Madagascar. It occurs in the eastern and southern rainforest belt of Madagascar, living along streams in rainforest. It can also live at the edge of rainforest, but not fully outside the rainforest. It is suffering from loss of its forest habitat.

References

rappiodes
Endemic frogs of Madagascar
Amphibians described in 1928
Taxonomy articles created by Polbot